Daniel Mögling (1596 in Böblingen – 1635 in Butzbach) was a German alchemist and a Rosicrucian.

Work 
Mögling is thought to have written Speculum Sophicum Rhodostauroticum (Mirror of the Wisdom of the Rosy Cross, 1618) under the pseudonym Teophilus Schweighardt Constantiens, and Jhesus Nobis Omnia – Rosa Florescens (1617) under the pseudonym Florentinus de Valentia. He was personal physician and court astronomer to Philip III, Landgrave of Hesse-Butzbach from 1621 to 1635. He translated Philip Sidney's novel Arcadia into German.

See also 
Esotericism
Hermeticism

References

External links 
Rosie: Speculum Sophicum Rhodo-Stauroticum
The Alchemy website: Speculum sophicum rhodostauroticum
University College of London: Rosicrucian text

German alchemists
People from Böblingen
1596 births
1635 deaths
17th-century German people
17th-century alchemists
17th-century German male writers